The June 2020 bomb cyclone was a hurricane-force extratropical cyclone in South Region, Brazil which impacted the states of Santa Catarina, Rio Grande do Sul and Paraná on June 30, 2020. Twelve deaths were confirmed, ten in Santa Catarina, one in Rio Grande do Sul and one in Paraná. In addition to almost 1.9 million consumers without electricity in the three states.

Meteorological history

During strong storms that hit the South Region of Brazil on June 30, 2020, cities registered winds of more than 120 km/h in several points of Santa Catarina, Rio Grande do Sul and Paraná. This phenomenon is known as "cyclone-bomb", because in this region a sharp drop in atmospheric pressure was recorded over a period of 24 hours, causing cyclones that were not predictable by meteorologists.

Until 9pm BRT on the 30th, three deaths were registered as a result of cyclones in Santa Catarina, one in the city of Chapecó, one in Santo Amaro da Imperatriz and one in Tijucas, besides one death in Rio Grande do Sul, in the city of Nova Prata.

Tornadoes in Brazil

References

Natural disasters in Brazil
2020 natural disasters
June 2020 events in Brazil
2020 in Brazil
2020 disasters in Brazil